Foster Powell (1734–15 April 1793) was the first notable exponent of long-distance walking known as pedestrianism and has been called "the first English athlete of whom we have any record". Powell started the focus on walking/running for six days and is considered the “Father of the Six-Day Race.”

Life
Powell was baptized in Horsforth in 1734, and moved to London in 1762 where he worked as a lawyer's clerk. In 1764 he began his pedestrian career by wagering that he could walk 50 miles in 7 hours, which he accomplished on the Bath Road. He became a national celebrity, but made very little  money from walking, which he treated as a hobby, and died in relative poverty at the age of 59 on 15 April 1793.  He was buried at St Faith's Church in St Paul's Cathedral Churchyard, after a walking funeral procession.

Feats
In 1773 he walked 400 miles from London to York and back, and in 1788 walked 100 miles in 21 hours 35 minutes. He also ran 2 miles in 10 minutes.

References

External links

The Six-Day Race – Part 1: The Birth (1773-1870)
Foster Powell - The Celebrated Pedestrian

1734 births
1793 deaths
People from Horsforth
Walkers of the United Kingdom
British male racewalkers
Sportspeople from Yorkshire